The Daws-Keys House in Aztec, New Mexico was listed on the National Register of Historic Places in 1985.

It is a hipped roof cottage, deemed notable as an intact "fine reminder" of its type from before the railroad reached the town.

References

Houses on the National Register of Historic Places in New Mexico
San Juan County, New Mexico